The 2022 Guelph municipal election was held on October 24, 2022, to elect the Mayor of Guelph, Guelph City Council and the Upper Grand District School Board, Wellington Catholic District School Board, Conseil scolaire catholique MonAvenir and Conseil scolaire Viamonde. The election will be held on the same day as elections in every other municipality in Ontario.

In 2021, the city held a ward boundary review, altering the boundaries of its six wards to be used for the 2022 election.

In total, prior to the August 19th deadline, six candidates had registered to run for mayor and 40 for the twelve council seats. Official vote counts were released by the city clerk's office within days of the election.

Mayor
Guelph mayor Cam Guthrie announced he was running for re-election on May 3, 2022.

City Council
Each ward elects two councillors. Voters may vote for two candidates in each ward.

Ward 1

Ward 2

Ward 3

Ward 4

Ward 5

Ward 6

References

Guelph
Municipal elections in Guelph